The 2002 Buffalo Bulls football team represented the University at Buffalo in the 2002 NCAA Division I-A football season. The Bulls offense scored 214 points while the defense allowed 416 points. Though the Bulls went 1–11 on the season, they did make team history by recording their first victory over a team from a Bowl Championship Series conference, a 34–11 road victory over Big East member Rutgers on September 7, 2002.

Schedule

Roster

References

Buffalo
Buffalo Bulls football seasons
Buffalo Bulls football